is a Japanese manga series written and illustrated by Taiyō Matsumoto. It was serialized in Shogakukan's seinen manga magazine Monthly Ikki from November 2000 to January 2005. Shogakukan compiled its chapters into eight wideban volumes.

In North America, Viz Media released the series' first two volumes in 2002 and 2003, but due to low sales it was discontinued. Viz Media republished the series in a four-volume omnibus edition from July 2021 to April 2022.

Publication
No. 5, written and illustrated by Taiyō Matsumoto, began in the first ever issue of Shogakukan's Spirits Zōkan Ikki (re-branded as Monthly Ikki in 2003), released on November 30, 2000. The series finished in the March 2005 issue of Monthly Ikki, published on January 25, 2005. Shogakukan collected its chapters into eight wideban volumes, released from November 30, 2001, to February 28, 2005. Shogakukan would later re-released the series into four deluxe volumes from November 30 to December 26, 2005.

In North America, Viz Media announced the license of the series in December 2001. A preview for the then forthcoming first volume was published in the January 2002 issue of Pulp. Viz Media published the first volume on April 5, 2002, and the second on August 13, 2003. After having released these two volumes, Viz Media ceased the series' publication due to low sales. In 2011, the series was completely available in English language via the No. 5 app on iTunes. In October 2020, Viz Media announced that they would re-publish the series in a four-volume deluxe edition, in print and digital formats, released from July 20, 2021, to April 19, 2022.

The manga was also licensed in France by Kana.

Volume list
Note: All chapters titles are written in English on the original Japanese release.

Reception
No. 5 was one of the Jury Recommended Works at the 7th Japan Media Arts Festival in 2003.

References

External links
 
 

Manga series
Science fiction anime and manga
Seinen manga
Shogakukan manga
Taiyō Matsumoto
Thriller anime and manga
Viz Media manga